Vive ("Live") is a studio album by Mexican pop singer Lucía Méndez. It was released in 2004 by Universal Music Mexico. "La pareja dispareja" and "Almas Gemelas" feature Mexican band Los Tucanes de Tijuana.

Track listing
 Aunque Me Duela El Alma
 El Cubano está Loco
 La Pareja Dispareja (Lucía Méndez / Los Tucanes de Tijuana)
 Que Te Ruegue Tu Madre
 Si Quieres (Juan Gabriel)
 Vive
 Así Soy Yo
 Atrápame
 Almas Gemelas (Lucía Méndez / Los Tucanes de Tijuana)
 Corazón de Piedra (2004 Dance Version)

Singles
 Aunque Me Duela El Alma / El Cubano está Loco
 La Pareja Dispareja (Lucía Méndez / Los Tucanes de Tijuana)

Video Clips
 La Pareja Dispareja (Lucía Méndez / Los Tucanes de Tijuana)

2004 albums
Lucía Méndez albums